The CONCACAF Gold Cup is North America's major tournament in senior men's football and determines the continental champion. Until 1989, the tournament was known as CONCACAF Championship. It is currently held every two years. In earlier editions, the continental championship was held in different countries, but since the inception of the Gold Cup in 1991, the United States are constant hosts or co-hosts.

From 1973 to 1989, the tournament doubled as the confederation's World Cup qualification. CONCACAF's representative team at the FIFA Confederations Cup was decided by a play-off between the winners of the last two tournament editions in 2015 via the CONCACAF Cup, but was then discontinued along with the Confederations Cup.

Since the inaugural tournament in 1963, the Gold Cup was held 26 times and has been won by seven different nations, most often by Mexico (11 titles).

In select editions, teams from other confederations have regularly joined the tournament as invitees. During this time span, Brazil participated three times: in 1996, 1998 and 2003. They reached the tournament final twice, but lost to Mexico on both occasions. Thanks to their good results they rank 12th out of 27 nations in the tournaments all-time table in spite of only three participations - right ahead of Cuba, who participated ten times.

Record at the CONCACAF Championship/Gold Cup

1996 CONCACAF Gold Cup

Group C

Semi-final

Final

1998 CONCACAF Gold Cup

Group A

Semi-final

Third-place match

2003 CONCACAF Gold Cup

Group A

Quarter-final

Semi-final

Final

Record players

Top goalscorers
At each of Brazil's three Gold Cup participations, one player scored three goals during the tournament.

References

Countries at the CONCACAF Gold Cup
History of the Brazil national football team